Emily Maria Eardley Childers (1866–1922), known as Milly Childers, was an English painter of the later Victorian era and the early twentieth century.

She was the daughter of Hugh Childers, a prominent Member of Parliament and Cabinet minister of his generation. Little is known about Milly Childers's early life; she began exhibiting her art around 1890. After her father's 1892 retirement from public service, father and daughter traveled together through England and France; Milly Childers painted landscapes and church interiors. Her father's social and political connections brought his daughter some commissioned work, including as a restorer and copyist for Lord Halifax at Temple Newsam. Childers exhibited her work at the Palace of Fine Arts at the 1893 World's Columbian Exposition in Chicago, Illinois.

One of Childers' best-known works is a portrait of her father; another is her own self portrait from 1889. Other of her better-known works are Children Playing Hoops in the Street, Arromanches and The Pannier market, Barnstaple. Her style shows influences from the Impressionists.

References

External links

 British Women Painters: 1893 Exposition
The Terrace (1909 painting of the terrace at the UK Houses of Parliament)
Photo of Childers and her work (National Portrait Gallery, London)

1866 births
1922 deaths
19th-century English painters
20th-century English painters
20th-century English women artists
19th-century English women artists
English women painters
Milly